WJPX (channel 24) is a Spanish-language Independent television station licensed to San Juan, Puerto Rico. The station brands itself as América TeVé Puerto Rico.

WIRS, virtual channel 42 (UHF digital channel 17), is a semi-satellite of WJPX and a Sonlife-affiliated television station licensed to Yauco, Puerto Rico.

The two stations share studio facilities located in Amelia Industrial Park in Guaynabo (shared studios with Mega TV owned-and-operated WTCV), and shared its transmitter facilities with WTCV located at Barrio Cubuy in Canovanas and the transmitter located at the WVEO transmitter site at Cerro Canta Gallo in Aguada.

There are owned by America CV Stations Group.

History

The station was founded in 1987 and was a 24-hour news station branded as WSJN 24 Horas, El Canal de Noticias. Some Puerto Rican television reporters started their careers at WSJN, such as Maria Celeste Arraras, Ada Torres Toro, Sol Sostre, Nelson Bermejo, Tony Dandrades, Luis Guardiola, Nellie Rivera, Lyanne Melendez, Edna Schmidt and Roberto Cortes.

In 1993, WSJN-TV returned to the air, and was owned by El Nuevo Comandante Racetrack corporation, broadcasting Horse racing, and it is branded as Telenet.

On January 13, 1998, WSJN-TV changed its callsign to the current WJPX, after Paxson Communications purchased the station. On August 31, 1998, WJPX, along with the rest of the Paxson stations, premiered the new Pax TV television network, with a programming mix of infomercials, off-network reruns labeled as "family entertainment", and The Worship Network during overnights.

WJPX was later sold to LIN TV in 2000, which affiliated the station with MTV.  At that time, the station broadcast MTV programs (both locally produced and imported from the main MTV network), videos and horse races. The MTV branding and programming were licensed from Viacom, which, incidentally, once owned two of WJPX's then-sister stations: WWHO in Columbus, Ohio and WNDY-TV in Indianapolis, before those stations were sold to LIN in 2005.

On October 19, 2006 LIN TV announced that it had entered into an agreement to sell WJPX along with sister station WAPA-TV to InterMedia Partners for $130 million in cash. The sale was completed on March 30, 2007.

InterMedia Partners then sold the station again to Caribevision Station Group. The sale was completed in October 2007.

From March 19, 2009 the subchannel digital 24.2 began transmitting Camarero Racetrack.

On August 13, 2012, WJPX began broadcasting MundoFox; at that time, América Tevé moved to WIRS channel 42.1. On June 15, 2015, MundoFox (which became MundoMax the following month) was moved to channel 24.1 on WKPV in Ponce, WIRS, and WJWN-TV in San Sebastian, while América Tevé moved to channel 42.1 on WJPX, WKPV, and WJWN.

WJPX airs infomercials 19 hours a day on weekdays (11pm to 5pm), and 10 ½ hours & 8 hours on weekends (8:30am to 7pm & 11pm to 7am).

WJPX's affiliation with MundoMax ended on August 1, 2016. At that time, the station began to carry América Tevé on channel 24.1. On that same date, WIRS launched a new programming format called Teveo, which is stylized as a 24-hour news channel that airs each weekday from 5:00 p.m. to 12:00 a.m. and weekends from 7:00 to 11:00 p.m. Teveo carries all of the station's live newscasts, along with rebroadcasts of its 6:00 and 11:00 p.m. newscasts and its public affairs programs. It also added live weekday hour-long 7:00 and 9:00 p.m. newscasts on that date, making it the only station in Puerto Rico with newscasts in those timeslots. On weekends, Teveo carries a "week-in-review" selection of its news programs. Paid programming is shown at other times of the day. The channel is simulcast on WIRS digital channel 42.1, and is carried on Liberty channel 41, Claro TV channel 10 and Dish Network channel 7. On November 12, 2016, WIRS was disaffiliated with Teveo and switched to the Sonlife Broadcasting Network, a religious television network, owned by televangelist Jimmy Swaggart, which was seen on W26DK-D channel 25.2 in San Juan, W31DL-D channel 36.2 in Ponce and W51DJ-D channel 51.2 in Mayaguez.

Digital television

WJPX's digital signal is multiplexed:

WIRS's digital signal is multiplexed:

WJPX and WJWN-TV shut down their analog signals over UHF channels 24 and 38, on June 12, 2009, the official date in which full-power television stations in the United States transitioned from analog to digital broadcasts under federal mandate. WKPV and WIRS shut down their analog signals on channels 20 and 42 on April 17. The stations' digital signals remained on their pre-transition UHF channels 21, 19, 41 & 39. Through the use of PSIP, digital television receivers display the stations' virtual channels at UHF channels 24, 42, 20 and 38.

Satellite stations
WJPX and WIRS can be seen across Puerto Rico on the following stations:

FCC spectrum auction & WJPX/WIRS sale 
In 2012, the Federal Communications Commission announced they were going to hold a voluntary Incentive Auction for a portion of the radio frequency spectrum that is currently used by Digital Television broadcasters across the country. WJPX & WIRS announced he would participate in the auction, since it was estimated the stations would net somewhere in the range of $291 & US$264 Million, much more than it would be worth on the open market otherwise. Since that time the auction estimate has increased to somewhere between $220 & US$198 Million, with the auction currently scheduled to take place in early 2016.

Spectrum reallocation 
On April 13, 2017, it was revealed that WKPV and WIRS's over-the-air spectrum had been sold in the FCC's spectrum reallocation auction, fetching $6,945,255 and $6,657,792 respectively. WKPV and WIRS will not sign off, but it will later share broadcast spectrum with WVEO in Aguadilla and WVOZ-TV in Ponce, both of them are Mega TV owned and operated. America CV stated that WJPX had a better signal than that of WKPV and WIRS.

External links 
America Tevé Puerto Rico
Sonlife Broadcasting Network

References

Mass media in San Juan, Puerto Rico
Television channels and stations established in 1987
JPX
1987 establishments in Puerto Rico